Uvas may refer to:

Places
 Las Uvas, Panama
 Llagas-Uvas, California, United States
 Rancho Las Uvas, California, United States
 Sierra de las Uvas, New Mexico, United States
 Uvas Creek, California, United States
 Uvas Falls, California, United States
 Uvas Reservoir Reservoir, artificial lake located west of San Martin, California in the United States

Other
 University of Veterinary and Animal Sciences

See also